Sifang is a former district at the core of Qingdao, People's Republic of China. In December 2012, it was merged into Shibei District.

References

External links 
 Information page

History of Qingdao
Former districts of China